Anacharsis was a Scythian philosopher; he travelled from his homeland on the northern shores of the Black Sea, to Ancient Athens, in the early 6th century BC, and made a great impression as a forthright and outspoken barbarian, that is, a non-Greek speaker. He very well could have been a forerunner of the Cynics, in part because of his strong, but playful, parrhesia. None of his works have survived.

Life
Anacharsis the son of Gnurus, a Scythian chief, was half Greek and from a mixed Hellenic culture, apparently in the region of the Cimmerian Bosporus. He left his native country to travel in pursuit of knowledge, and came to Athens about 589 BC, at a time when Solon was occupied with his legislative measures.

According to the story recounted by Hermippus, Anacharsis arrived at the house of Solon and said, "I have traveled here from afar to make you my friend." Solon replied, "It's better to make friends at home." Thereupon the Scythian replied, "Then it is necessary for you, being at home, to make friends with me." Solon laughed and accepted him as his friend.

Anacharsis cultivated the outsider's knack of seeing the illogic in familiar things. For example, Plutarch remarks that he "expressed his wonder at the fact that in Greece wise men spoke and fools decided." His conversation was droll and frank, and Solon and the Athenians took to him as a sage and philosopher. His rough and free discourse became proverbial among Athenians as 'Scythian discourse'.

Anacharsis was the first foreigner (metic) who received the privileges of Athenian citizenship. He was reckoned by some ancient authors as one of the Seven Sages of Greece, and it is said that he was initiated into the Eleusinian Mysteries of the Great Goddess, a privilege denied to those who did not speak fluent Greek.

According to Herodotus, when Anacharsis returned to the Scythians he was killed by his own brother for his Greek ways and especially for the impious attempt to sacrifice to the Mother Goddess Cybele, whose cult was unwelcome among the Scythians.

Ideas

None of the works ascribed to him in ancient times, if indeed they were written by him, have survived. He was said to have written a book comparing the laws of the Scythians with the laws of the Greeks, as well as work on the art of war. All that remains of his thought is what later tradition ascribes to him. He became famous for the simplicity of his way of living and his acute observations on the institutions and customs of the Greeks. He exhorted moderation in everything, saying that the vine bears three clusters of grapes: the first, pleasure; the second, drunkenness; the third, disgust. So he became a kind of emblem to the Athenians, who inscribed on his statues: 'Restrain your tongues, your appetites, your passions.'

There are ten extant letters ascribed to him, one of which is also quoted by Cicero:
Greetings from Anacharsis to Hanno: My clothing is a Scythian cloak, my shoes are the hard soles of my feet, my bed is the earth, my food is only seasoned by hunger - and I eat nothing but milk and cheese and meat. Come and visit me, and you will find me at peace. You want to give me something. But give it to your fellow-citizens instead, or let the immortal gods have it.
 
All of the letters are spurious. The first nine probably date from the 3rd century BC, they are usually included among the Cynic epistles, and reflect how the Cynic philosophers viewed him as prefiguring many of their ideas; the tenth letter is quoted by Diogenes Laërtius, it is addressed to Croesus, the proverbially rich king of Lydia. It too is fictitious: 
Anacharsis to Croesus: O king of the Lydians, I am come to the country of the Greeks, in order to become acquainted with their customs and institutions; but I have no need of gold, and shall be quite contented if I return to Scythia a better man than I left it. However I will come to Sardis, as I think it very desirable to become a friend of yours.

Strabo makes him the (probably legendary) inventor of the anchor with two flukes, and others made him the inventor of the potter's wheel.

Having been informed that Solon was employed to draw up a code of laws for the Athenians, Anacharsis described his occupation, saying:
Laws are spider-webs, which catch the little flies, but cannot hold the big ones.
"Solon showed Anacharsis some laws that he was drafting for the Athenians. Anacharsis laughed at Solon for imagining that the dishonesty and greed of the Athenians could be restrained by written laws. Such laws, said Anacharsis, are like spiderwebs: they catch the weak and poor, but the rich can rip right through them."

Revival in the 18th century

In 1788 Jean Jacques Barthelemy (1716–95), a highly esteemed classical scholar and Jesuit, published The Travels of Anacharsis the Younger in Greece about a young Scythian descended from Anacharsis. The 4-volume work was an imaginary travel journal, one of the first historical novels, which Klemperer called "the encyclopedia of the new cult of the antique" in the late 18th century. It affected the growth of philhellenism in France at the time. The book went through many editions, was reprinted in the United States and translated into German and other languages. It later inspired European sympathy for the Greek struggle for independence and spawned sequels and imitations through the 19th century.

Sir William Gell signed some of the letters he wrote to the diarist and author of ‘Diary Of The Times of George IV’ with the pseudonym  ‘Anacharsis’ see page 263 volume 3.

Quotes
"A vine bears three grapes, the first of pleasure, the second of drunkenness, and the third of repentance" —Diogenes Laërtius, of Anacharsis.
"He also said that he marvelled that among the Greeks, those who were skilful in a thing contend together; but those who have no such skill act as judges of the contest." —Diogenes Laërtius, of Anacharsis.

Notes

Classical references
Herodotus iv. 46, 76–7; Lucian, Scytha; Cicero, Tusc. Disp. v. 32; Diogenes Laërtius i. 101–5; Athenaeus, iv. 159, x. 428, 437, xiv. 613; Aelian, Varia Historia, v. 7.

Modern studies
Charlotte Schubert, "Anacharsis der Weise" (Narr Verlag, Tübingen, 2010).

External links

Jean Jacques Barthelemy's The Travels of Anacharsis the Younger in Greece (French)

6th-century BC philosophers
Ancient Greeks who were murdered
Immigrants to Archaic Athens
Male murder victims
Presocratic philosophers
Scythian people
Seven Sages of Greece
6th-century BC Iranian people
Ancient Iranian philosophers